Guillermo Ortiz may refer to:

 Guillermo Ortiz Camargo (1939–2009), Mexican soccer player
 Guillermo Ortiz Martínez (born 1948), former Governor of the Bank of Mexico
 Guillermo Ortiz Mayagoitia, President of the Supreme Court
 Guillermo Ortiz (footballer) (born 1992), Argentine footballer